Tovarny is a rural locality (a settlement) in Ikryaninsky District, Astrakhan Oblast, Russia. The population was 639 as of 2010. There are 22 streets.

Geography 
Tovarny is located 45 km south of Ikryanoye (the district's administrative centre) by road. Mumra is the nearest rural locality.

References 

Rural localities in Ikryaninsky District